William Lloyd Budd (25 October 1913 – 1986) was an English first-class cricketer and umpire. Born in Hampshire on 25 October 1913, he played 60 first-class games for his native county as a right arm fast medium bowler and right-handed lower order batsman from 1934 to 1946. He took 64 wickets and scored 941 runs. He turned to umpiring after his playing days and stood in 4 home Test matches and 12 home One Day Internationals. The first Test he umpired was the controversial Test at Old Trafford in 1976 when England's batsmen John Edrich and Brian Close were subject to a bouncer barrage from the West Indian quick bowlers. His last Test was at Lord's in 1978 featuring the touring Pakistan team. He died in 1986 in Southampton.

See also
 List of Test cricket umpires
 List of One Day International cricket umpires

References

External links
Cricinfo: Lloyd Budd

1913 births
1986 deaths
English cricketers
Hampshire cricketers
London Counties cricketers
English Test cricket umpires
English One Day International cricket umpires